Perućica is one of the last remaining primeval forests in Europe. It is located in Bosnia and Herzegovina, near the border with Montenegro. It is part of the Sutjeska National Park. 

It is a UNESCO recognized site. The forest has many trees that are 300 years old, and the primeval forest's vintage is stated to be 20,000 years. In some stretches the forest growth is almost impenetrable, and the forest can only be explored in the company of rangers.

See also
 Skakavac Waterfall, Perućica
 Sutjeska (river)
 Sutjeska National Park
 List of national parks of Bosnia and Herzegovina
 Tara (Drina)
 Piva (river)
 Drina
 Neretva

References

External links
 Perućica official website 
 Sutjeska National Park - BH Tourism official website

Environment of Bosnia and Herzegovina
Geography of Republika Srpska
Old-growth forests
Protected areas of Bosnia and Herzegovina